Haslina Taib is a businesswoman from Brunei, who is the Chief Executive Officer of Dynamik Technologies. In 2010, the Brunei Women's Forum awarded her the Women Achievers in Corporate Sectors Award.

Career 
Haslina is Chief Executive Officer of Dynamik Technologies, formerly BAG Networks, a software development company based in Daraassalam. She has previously worked for KPMG, WPP and the Dorchester Group of Companies and holds Masters in Business Administration from both Harvard and Cranfield universities. In 2010, the Brunei Women's Forum awarded her the Women Achievers in Corporate Sectors Award.

From 2010 to 2016, she represented Brunei on the APEC Business Advisory Council and is a Fellow of the Association of Chartered Certified Accountants. Haslina has spoken out about how there is shortage of technically skilled workers in Brunei, but that under her leadership the company has moved away from needing to employ foreign workers.

In 2021, Haslina was Chair of the ASEAN Business and Investment Summit. In 2022, she launched new digital audio tours, developed by Dynamik Technology in partnership with the Ministries of Primary Resources & Tourism and Culture, Youth & Sports, at the Royal Regalia Museum.

Haslina also funded Najibah Era's Antarctic expedition.

References 

Living people
Year of birth missing (living people)
21st-century businesswomen
Bruneian businesspeople
Bruneian women
Alumni of Cranfield University
Harvard University alumni
Philanthropists